The 6500 Packet-Optical Platform (formerly called the Optical Multiservice Edge 6500 or OME 6500 during the product's time at Nortel) in telecommunication, computer networking and optical communications is a Multi-port multi-protocol system designed by Ciena that supports TDM/WDM/GigE/10G/40G and 100G ports.

The system supports high bandwidth demands from applications like IPTV, Internet Video, HD programming, and mobile video by increasing the speeds over existing fiber. Typically, increasing the speeds from 10G to 40G to 100G entails trade-offs such as shortening the distance of each network segment or increasing optical dispersion because of the weakening of optical signals as they travel. Prevention of this signal loss would normally require amplifiers or repeaters, or in some cases, installing new and finer-quality fiber. Nortel overcomes this signal loss by using a signal modulation technology called dual-polarization quadrature phase shift keying (DPQPSK).

Modules

100 Gigabit Module
 1 port 100 Gigabit/s Module
The 100G Gigabit Module effectively uses two wavelengths

40 Gigabit Module
 1 port 40 Gigabit/s Module

10 Gigabit Module
 4 port 10 Gigabit/s Module

See also
 100 Gigabit Ethernet
 Phase-shift keying

References

External links
 Ciena 6500 Packet-Optical Platform

Ciena
OME
Ethernet